The Hespeler Shamrocks are a junior ice hockey team based in Hespeler, Ontario, Canada.  They are currently members of the Provincial Junior Hockey League. The team was known as the Simcoe Storm from 1989-2017 and had played in Simcoe, Ontario since 1959 before relocating in 2018.

History
The Simcoe Juniors were founded in 1959 as members of the Niagara District Junior B Hockey League.  A season later, they took the name "Pacers".

In 1961, the Simcoe Pacers jumped to the Central Junior C Hockey League.  They soon changed their names to the Simcoe Blades.

1965 championship run
The Simcoe Blades finished their sixth season, fourth in the Central Jr. C league, with a record of 26 wins and only five losses.  With first place clinched, the Blades met the pesky Hespeler Shamrocks in the Central League quarter-final.  The Shamrocks battled hard and at one point even led in the series, but the Blades rebounded and won the series 4-games-to-2.  In the league semi-final, the Blades drew the Preston Pals.  The Pals were "out of their league" and were swept in three games in a best-of-five series.  They then drew the Milton Merchants in the league final and defeated them four games straight to win the Central League Crown.  With their league out of the way, they then moved into the Provincial play-downs.  Their provincial semi-final opponent would end-up being the Point Edward Redmen, who had defeated the Port Huron junior team to advance this far.  The best-of-five series was hard-fought.  In game one, the Blades led 9-1 after two periods.  In the third, a vicious line-brawl broke out involving all ten skaters and one goalie.  Game one was one by the Blades 11-5.  Game two saw the Blades come from behind to defeat the Redmen 5-2.  The third game had the Blades show the Redmen exactly how good they were, as they crushed them 13-3 to take the series.  In the other provincial semi-final, the Lindsay Merchants took out the Penetang Hurons 4-games-to-1 to meet the Blades in the final.  The All-Ontario final took place in late April and early May 1965 between Simcoe and Lindsay.  Simcoe took the first three games: 7-2, 5-1, and 3-1.  Each game got closer as Lindsay grew stronger.  Game four in Lindsay had the Merchants prove why they made the final, taking the game 6-5 with a huge surge in the second period.  Game five was back in Simcoe on May 3.  Lindsay made a game of it, leading 3-2 after the second frame.  In the next period, the Blades scored the equalizer halfway through, before Doug Macaulay scored the winner with 3:34 remaining in the third in front of an estimated 1,400 fans.  After only six years of existence, the Simcoe junior team won its first provincial championship.

The 1966-67 season has the Central league divide up into the Inter-county Junior C Hockey League and the Western Junior C Hockey League.  The Blades went to the Inter-county league.

In 1969, the Blades folded less than 20 games into the 1968-69 Inter-county Junior C season.  Their final game saw them take a 14-0 drubbing against the Ingersoll Marlands.  With only nine skaters and a goalie at the game, the goaltender for the Blades quit the team at the end of the second period.  Ingersoll's back up goalie played the remainder for the Blades.  It would be the last game the "Blades" would ever play.

The next season, the team returned as the Simcoe Chargers.

In 1972, the team became the Jets and they joined the Central Junior C Hockey League.  That season they would lose a nail-biting series to the Caledonia Corvairs, 3-games-to-2 in the league quarter-finals.  The Corvairs would go on to win both the league and the OHA Junior C championship.

1974: Two-time finalists
The 1973-74 proved to be a strange year for the Simcoe Jets.  The Jets finished the 1973-74 season in third place with 20 wins, 10 losses, and only two ties.  They entered the league quarter-finals against the Hanover Barons.  The series proved to be a 3-games-to-none sweep for the Jets.  In the semi-final, the Jets drew the New Hamburg Hahns.  The usually powerful Hahns were not up to the challenge provided by the Jets, as Simcoe won 3-games-to-1.  This entered the Jets into the Central Junior C League's finals against the Woodstock Navy-Vets.  The Vets took game one 3-1, the Jets took back game two 4-2.  The Vets won game three 4-1, while the Jets returned the favour in the overtime of game four, 3-2.  The Jets then put on the "jets" and took their first series lead with a game five 2-0 victory.  Woodstock, with their backs to the wall, came back and won both games six and seven (6-4, 3-1) to win the Central league crown.  But the Jets were not out, not because they won but because Woodstock was technically too big of a town to play in the OHA Junior C playdowns.  Woodstock moved on to play the Owen Sound Salvagemen in the OHA Super C finals (Woodstock won 4-games-to-none) and Simcoe gained a birth to the OHA Junior C semi-finals.  In the semi-finals they were greeted by the Leamington Flyers of the Great Lakes Junior C Hockey League. Simcoe lost game one, 4-2, but took the next four straight 6-5, 4-1, 11-7, and 5-3 to earn a berth into the OHA Finals.  The other finalists were the Cobourg Cougars, and the Jets had a good start against them with a 5-4 victory.  Game two was won 6-5 in overtime by Cobourg.  Game two was won 4-3 in double overtime, but was marred by a bench clearing brawl at the end of the first overtime period.  Cobourg took game four in regulation 2-1 and then crushed a defeated Jets squad 9-6 in the fifth and final game.  The Jets would be two-time finalists, but not champions.

In 1974, they joined the newly formed Niagara & District Junior C Hockey League.  Then in 1976, they took another crack at Junior B with the Southwestern Junior B Hockey League.  After two seasons with the SWJBHL, they then jumped to the Golden Horseshoe Junior B Hockey League.

1976–1980: Back in Junior B
In 1976, the Simcoe Jets took their franchise's second attempt at Junior B Hockey.  Stepping on the ice with the Southwestern Junior B Hockey League, the Jets were promoted with the Brantford Penguins, Tillsonburg Mavericks, Woodstock Navy-Vets, London Diamonds, St. Thomas Colonels.  The Jets finished the 1976-77 season with a 16-21-2 record.  In the league's second and final season, the Jets finished with a near-identical record of 16-22-2.  The SWJBHL was divided up, and the Jets found themselves in the Golden Horseshoe Junior B Hockey League.  In their first season in the GHJHL, the Jets finished in sixth place with 13 wins, and in their second season, they finished seventh with 14 wins.  After four losing seasons, the Jets elected to return to the Niagara & District Junior C Hockey League in 1980.

They were now known as the Storm and Stable, dating back to 1989. Prior to 1989, Simcoe had suffered almost annual financial strife.  On top of folding in 1969, the franchise sat out the 1982-83 season as well as the 1988-89 season.

2006 Niagara Champions
After finishing second overall in the Niagara District Junior C league regular season standings with 28 wins, six losses, and two losses in overtime, the Simcoe Storm seemed destined for great things in the 2006 playoffs.  In the Western Division semi-final, the Storm drew the Woodstock Navy-Vets.  The Storm crushed the Vets in four straight games.  In the Western Division final, the Storm then were challenged by the Norwich Merchants.  The Storm took them out, winning the series 4-games-to-1, taking the Western Division crown.  Next they took on the top ranked and annual Clarence Schmalz Cup contending Grimsby Peach Kings.  The Storm shocked the Peach Kings by defeating them handily, 4-games-to-1, to win the Niagara League championship and gain a berth into the provincial semi-finals.  In them semi-finals, the Storm drew the defending Schmalz Cup champion Essex 73's.  The 73's knocked the Storm out, sweeping them in four games.

50 years
The 2008-09 season marked the 50th year since the founding of the franchise in 1959.  The 2008-09 also marked the 20th anniversary of the "Storm" moniker. However, in 2017 the Storms quietly changed their name to the Shamrocks revealing green and gold uniforms at their season opener.

Junior C re-organization
Prior to the start of the 2016-17 season the Southern Ontario Junior C leagues amalgamated under the Provincial Junior Hockey League.  All the leagues remained intact but were group into conferences (two leagues to a conference) and all leagues received a new identity. For the Storm it meant that the Niagara & District Junior C Hockey League was now the Bloomfield Division of the South Conference.

COVID-19 pandemic
The playoffs for the 2019-20 season were cancelled due to the COVID-19 pandemic, leading to the team not being able to play a single game.

Season-by-season results

Key:
NDJBHL - Niagara District Junior B Hockey League
CJCHL - Central Junior C Hockey League
ICJCHL - Intercounty Junior C Hockey League
SCJDHL - Southern Counties Junior D Hockey League
NJCHL - Niagara & District Junior C Hockey League
SWJBHL - Southwestern Junior B Hockey League
GHJHL - Golden Horseshoe Junior B Hockey League
SWJCHL - Southwestern Junior C Hockey League
PJHL - Provincial Junior Hockey League

Current roster

Clarence Schmalz Cup appearances
1965: Simcoe Blades defeated Lindsay Muskies 4-games-to-1
1974: Cobourg Cougars defeated Simcoe Jets 4-games-to-1

Notable alumni
Rick Wamsley
Dwayne Roloson
Jassen Cullimore

References

External links
Hespeler Shamrocks homepage
Niagara League homepage
National Hockey League HHOF Alumni resource

Niagara Junior C Hockey League teams
Ice hockey clubs established in 1959
Sport in Cambridge, Ontario